The Sour Tour was the debut concert tour by American singer-songwriter and actress Olivia Rodrigo in support of her debut studio album, Sour (2021). It began on April 5, 2022 in Portland, Oregon, with shows across North America and Europe. It concluded in London on July 7, comprising 48 shows. Gracie Abrams, Holly Humberstone, Chappell Roan, and Baby Queen served as opening acts.

Background
In July 2021, Billboard reported that the singer would be unable to embark on a tour until the following year due to her television commitments and her contract with Disney. An official concert cycle was announced through social media on December 6, with tickets going on sale four days later.

Tickets for the tour went on sale December 10 for fans who were chosen for "Verified Fan" registration. Tickets sold out in minutes, although many attributed this to ticket scalpers, with some tickets being listed on secondhand sites for more than $9,000 within minutes of tickets going on sale. Many fans and media outlets criticized the choosing of smaller venues over arenas, citing it as the reason many fans were unable to secure tickets. Rodrigo defended her decision to perform at smaller venues, telling the Los Angeles Times "I don’t think I should skip any steps" and assuring fans "there will be more tours in the future."

Set list 

This set list was representative of the show on April 5, 2022, in Portland. It was not representative of all concerts for the duration of the tour.
 "Brutal"
 "Jealousy, Jealousy"
 "Drivers License"
 "Complicated" (Avril Lavigne cover)
 "Hope Ur OK"
 "Enough For You" / "1 Step Forward, 3 Steps Back"
 "Happier"
 "Seether" (Veruca Salt cover)
 "Favorite Crime"
 "Traitor"
 "Deja Vu"
 "Good 4 U"

Shows

Personnel 
 Olivia Rodrigo - lead vocals, piano and guitar
 Heather Baker - guitar, backing vocals, musical director
 Daisy Spencer - guitar
 Hayley Brownell - drums
 Arianna Powell - guitar, backing vocals
 Moa Munoz - bass guitar, backing vocals and keyboards
 Camila Mora - keyboards, backing vocals
 Matheus Bremer - acoustic guitar

Notes

See also
 Olivia Rodrigo discography
 List of awards and nominations received by Olivia Rodrigo

References 

2022 concert tours
Olivia Rodrigo concert tours
Concert tours of Canada
Concert tours of Europe
Concert tours of North America
Concert tours of the United Kingdom
Concert tours of the United States